The Cheetah Girls is a media franchise created by Deborah Gregory based on her novel series of the same name. The series, which began in 1999, is about a female vocal group seeking success and fortune. In the book series, there are five Cheetah Girls, but in the first film adaption and its sequel, there are only four, while in the third film installment, there are only three.

Characters 
The real-life R&B girl group Before Dark originally posed as three of the girls on the book covers. 
 Arike Rice, based on Aquanette "Aqua" Walker (books 1-4)
 Jeni Rice, based on Anginette "Angie" Walker (books 1-4)
 Mia Lee, based on Galleria "Bubbles" Garibaldi (books 1-8)
 Brandi Stewart, based on Chanel "Chuchie" Simmons
 Imani Parks, based on Dorinda "Do" Rogers
 Davida Williams, based on Galleria "Bubbles" Garibaldi (books 9-13)
 Sonya Millen, based on Aquanette "Aqua" Walker (books 5-13)
 Sabrina Millen, based on Anginette "Angie" Walker (books 5-13)

Details 
 Chanel "Chuchie" Simmons is of Puerto Rican, Cuban and Dominican descent and is noted for her trademark mini-micro braids. Chanel has a flair for designer clothing (notably, she shares the last name of designer Coco Chanel and the perfume Chanel) and once charged hundreds of dollars on her mother's credit card. She is fluent in both English and Spanish. She is very body conscious, and developed somewhat of an eating disorder near the end of the book series. She and Galleria took ballet lessons until grade 6. Chanel continues to practice ballet. Her interests include hair and singing. She lives with her mother and brother, Pucci in SoHo. In the films, she is portrayed by Adrienne Bailon.
 Anginette "Angie" Walker is of African-American descent, is the only member of the group not to narrate a book in the series, and the only main character cut out of the movie adaptation. She lets her twin sister, Aquanette Walker, do most of the talking, and is very sneaky. She lives with her sister and father on the Upper West Side. Her nicknames include "Angie" and "Nettie Two". She loves horror movies, and wants to be a doctor one day. She also loves gospel music. There is no Anginette in the Cheetah Girls films, because Disney couldn't find the right twin girls to play both her and Aqua and they decided to drop Angie from the movies.
 Aquanette "Aqua" Walker, Aqua for short and sister Anginette, narrates in the books "Hey, Ho, Hollywood!", "Growl Power!", "In the House with Mouse" and "Twinkle, Twinkle, Cheetah Stars". Her character is also used in The Cheetah Girls, where she is portrayed by Kiely Williams, former member of 3LW. She moved from Houston, Texas to New York City with her father when her parents separated. In the books, Aquanette and her sister are known for having the strongest voices in the group. She has a warm personality, and constantly carries hot sauce in her purse. She and Anginette Walker live on the Upper West Side. Aqua is very religious, and attends church every Sunday. Unlike her sister, she is aggressive, and speaks her mind when she is unhappy. Her interests include horror movies, animals, and one day becoming a doctor. She has three pets: two guinea pigs and a dog.
 Galleria "Bubbles" Garibaldi narrates "Wishing On a Star", "Woof, There it is!", "Showdown at the Okie-Dokie" and "Oops, Doggy Dog!". She is of Italian and African-American descent. Galleria is the leader of the band, and lives with her upper class parents in an apartment on the exclusive Upper East Side. She is not only the lead singer of the group and co-founder (along with Chanel), but also the most aggressive of the group, and always speaks her mind, a quality which occasionally gets her into trouble with others. She is the writer of all the group's songs. She has a dog named Toto. She is portrayed by Raven-Symoné in the Disney Channel Original Movies The Cheetah Girls and The Cheetah Girls 2, but she was not portrayed in The Cheetah Girls: One World.
 Dorinda "Do" Rogers narrates "Who's Bout To Bounce?", "Dorinda's Secret", "Dorinda Gets a Groove" and "Bring It On!". Dorinda was born to a Japanese mother and African-American father. Dorinda describes herself as a scrambled egg due to her racial mixing. Although she is 12 years old, she attends the ninth grade at Fashion Industries High School. She is the smartest of the group, and the best dancer. She is also a foster child, and lives with ten other children in the housing projects of Harlem, New York. She eventually locates her biological sister, Tiffany. In the film, she is the same age as all the other Cheetah Girls. The character appears in the movies as Dorinda Thomas and is portrayed by the Latina American (of European and Mexican descent) actress Sabrina Bryan.

Films

The Cheetah Girls is a musical comedy trilogy series produced by Debra Martin Chase, co-produced by Cheryl Hill and executive produced by Whitney Houston. Based on young adult book series of the same name by Deborah Gregory, actresses including Raven-Symoné, Adrienne Bailon, Sabrina Bryan, Kiely Williams, and Lynn Whitfield are featured in the films. Besides The Cheetah Girls which was set in New York City, each of the other films have been set in a foreign country: The Cheetah Girls 2 in Barcelona, Spain, and The Cheetah Girls: One World in New Delhi, India.

Trilogy

The Cheetah Girls (2003)

A four-member teen girl group named the Cheetah Girls, (Raven-Symoné, Adrienne Bailon, Sabrina Bryan and Kiely Williams) go to a Manhattan High School for the Performing Arts and try to become the first freshmen to win the talent show in the school's history. During the talent show auditions, they meet a big-time producer named Jackal Johnson (Vince Corazza), who tries to make the group into superstars, but the girls run into many problems. Galleria becomes a full-time snob and forgets her friends, Dorinda has to choose between her friends or the dance club and other things that could break the Cheetah Girls apart permanently. The group faces many tough decisions, but they all know the right way to go in the end.

The Cheetah Girls 2 (2006)

The movie begins in Manhattan, set two years after the first film, where the Cheetah Girls have just completed their junior year and are performing at a Graduation Party for the Manhattan Magnet's Class of 2006 ("The Party's Just Begun").

Later while having a sleep-over at Galleria (Raven-Symoné)'s, Chanel (Adrienne Bailon) tells the girls that her mother, Juanita (Lori Anne Alter), is planning a trip to Barcelona, Spain, where they will be visiting Luc (Abel Folk), Juanita's boyfriend. Chanel is bummed and does not want to see Luc while the other girls are upset about being separated for the summer when Aquanette (Kiely Williams) sees a shooting star and the girls make a wish together - to go to Spain with Chanel. At that very moment, one of the girl's magazines flips pages until it comes across an ad for a Barcelona music festival. Galleria enters the Cheetah Girls and the next day, her mother Dorethea (Lynn Whitfield), Juanita, and the Cheetah Girls all travel to Spain.

When the girls arrive in Barcelona, they do some shopping before resting in a Cafe. Soon they hear a guitar playing and meet Angel (Peter Vives), a mysterious guitar player who accompanies them around Barcelona as they sing to the entire city, and he becomes Galleria's love interest ("Strut").

The next day the girls audition for the festival and earn a spot ("Cheetah Sisters (Barcelona Mix)").

The next day at breakfast, they meet Joaquin (Golan Yosef), a Count, Luc's godson, and a handsome dancer who becomes a love interest for Dorinda (Sabrina Bryan). The next day after Dorinda finds out Joaquin is a dancer, she goes to his studio, where he teaches her tango ("Dance With Me"). That night Joaquin takes the Cheetahs to the Dancing Cat, a local Spanish night club where all the new artists perform their songs ("Why Wait") ("A La Nanita Nana").

There they meet Spanish pop artist Marisol (Belinda), who will also compete in the Music Festival, and her manager/mother, Lola (Kim Manning), who plans a scheme to break up the Cheetah Girls, as they pose a threat to her daughter's chances in the competition, and she starts making Marisol distract Chanel from The Cheetah Girls. Meanwhile, Aqua and Dorothea have been designing clothes with Dorothea's old friends, Juanita is trying to get a proposal out of Luc, Dorinda is teaching hip hop to Joaquin's class, and Galleria is the only one focused on the competition, as she is writing a song called, "Amigas Cheetahs", which they will sing at the competition ("Do Your Own Thing").

Galleria notices that everyone is getting involved in other activities except for her ("It's Over"), and eventually decided to take a train to Paris, where she can meet up with her father, Francobollo, and he will take her back home to Manhattan. While at a train station, the other three girls find Galleria and sing the starting sequence of "Amigas Cheetahs", and Galleria says she will only come back if they stay focused. While Chanel walked around the house, she overhears Juanita talking to Dorothea about how she believes that Luc doesn't want to marry her because Chanel doesn't like him. Luc later proposes to Juanita, after Chanel gives him permission, and she gladly accepts. Luc tells Chanel that she can stay in New York with her friends for her upcoming senior year. However, the Cheetah Girls' dreams are in serious trouble. While they were performing Step Up, Lola convinces the Dancing Cat's manager to pay the Cheetah Girls money. The competition will only allow amateur performs to compete. Accepting payment from the Dancing Cat makes the Cheetah Girls professional performers. Angel, who was present during the entire exchange, investigates.

Right before Chanel is going to get changed to perform with Marisol, the Festival Director informs that the Cheetah Girls are able to perform after getting a tip. Everyone is surprised when they see that the informer was his nephew, Angel. He informed that Lola tried to sabotage the Cheetahs, and his uncle reinstates the girls as the Cheetah Girls. Lola tries to dispute, but the Director will not hear it. Marisol finally tells off her mother, saying she is quitting the competition because she loves to sing and her mother is just desperate to make her a star. The Cheetah Girls then perform "Amigas Cheetahs", and as a surprise, bring Marisol onto the stage, along with Joaquin's dancing crew, Angel on the guitar and the Director on the trumpet. Their song is a hit with the crowd.

The Cheetah Girls: One World (2008)

With Galleria (Raven-Symoné) at the University of Cambridge England, the girls are Chanel (Adrienne Bailon), Dorinda (Sabrina Bryan), and Aquanette (Kiely Williams) are cast in the lavish new Bollywood movie "Namaste Bombay". The Cheetah Girls travel across the globe to India. There, they meet Rahim (Rupak Ginn), the man cast as the lead, whom they realize is attractive, yet somewhat clumsy. After meeting the movie's choreographer, Gita (Deepti Daryanani), a dance battle erupts between themselves and Gita with her backup dancers, they discover that the musical's director, Vikram "Vik" (Michael Steger), must choose only one Cheetah for the role as the budget is only enough for one star.

When it becomes apparent that they must travel home, they are upset, until realizing they may each try out for the lead. Though they all make a promise to be fair in the competition, situations arise in which each member becomes jealous of the others' specific talents. Chanel befriends Vik, Dorinda befriends Rahim, and Aqua befriends a boy she has been in contact with since before leaving America, Amar (Kunal Sharma). Each girl is led to believe the producer of the film, Khamal (Roshan Seth), Vik's uncle, will choose her after the audition. Chanel is told because she is the better singer, she will receive the role, while Dorinda is promised the role as she is the best dancer, while Aqua is convinced the coveted role will be hers as she is the best actress. The three Cheetahs audition against one another with Chanel being awarded the role, which she later refuses realizing, as do the other Cheetahs, that friendship and unity are more important than furthering their individual or group careers.

After refusing the role, they set to convince Khamal to award Gita as the lead, to which he reluctantly agrees, ending in a scene from "Namaste Bombay" in which the Cheetahs sing and dance the titular song, "One World".

Release dates
Each film has received a Walt Disney Pictures release. The Cheetah Girls premiered on August 15, 2003, The Cheetah Girls 2 premiered on August 25, 2006 and The Cheetah Girls: One World premiered on August 22, 2008.

Cast

Note: A gray cell indicates character did not appear in that medium

In other media

Live shows

Video games

There are several video game tie-ins based on the series. The Cheetah Girls is a video game for the Game Boy Advance based on the franchise's two films. It was developed by Gorilla Systems, Inc. and released to the public by Buena Vista Games on September 12, 2006. A sequel, The Cheetah Girls: Pop Star Sensations, was released for Nintendo DS on October 9, 2007. A third installment, The Cheetah Girls: Passport to Stardom, was released for Nintendo DS on August 19, 2008, in North America and December 8 in PAL regions. In the game, the player controls the band, and plays as each Cheetah Girl. The player searches Manhattan, completing tasks such as finding an agent, selecting clothes to make outfits, choreographing new dance moves, and creating their own music for demo tracks. The player can earn cash by playing various mini-games, including such as flipping ribs, teaching dance, and selling clothes. Throughout the game, the Cheetah Girls perform shows in a variety of venues. Prior to performing, the player chooses the song, lighting, and visual effects. During the performances, the player plays a rhythm mini-game where they must time inputs on the controller to the visuals onscreen.

Books 

1999 
 The Cheetah Girls #01: Wishing on a Star
 The Cheetah Girls #02: Shop in the Name of Love 	
 The Cheetah Girls #03: Who's 'Bout to Bounce?  
 The Cheetah Girls #04: Hey, Ho, Hollywood! 
2000
 The Cheetah Girls #05: Woof, There It Is
 The Cheetah Girls #06: It's Raining Benjamins
 The Cheetah Girls #07: Dorinda's Secret
 The Cheetah Girls #08: Growl Power
2001
 The Cheetah Girls #09: Showdown at the Okie-Dokie
 The Cheetah Girls #10: Cuchifrita, Ballerina
 The Cheetah Girls #11: Dorinda Gets a Groove
 The Cheetah Girls #12: In the House With Mouse!
2002
 The Cheetah Girls #13: Oops, Doggy Dog!
2003
 The Cheetah Girls: Livin' Large! Books #1-#4 (Bind-Up #1)
 The Cheetah Girls Supa Dupa Sparkle! Books #5-#8 (Bind-Up #2)
2004
 The Cheetah Girls: Growl Power Forever! Books #9-#12 (Bind-Up #3)
 The Cheetah Girls: Movie Junior Novel
2005
 The Cheetah Girls: Off the Hook! Books #13-#16 (Bind-up #4)
 The Cheetah Girls Quiz Book
 The Cheetah Girls Supa-Star Scrapbook
 The Cheetah Girls: Cheetah Chatter
2006
 The Cheetah Girls: Movie Junior Novel 2
 XOXO, The Cheetah Girls

References

External links
 Disney's Cheetah Girls website
 

American young adult novels
Novel series
American children's novels
Novel series